Domokos is a town and municipality in Greece. Domokos may also refer to
Achilleas Domokos F.C., a Greek football club, based in Domokos
Battle of Domokos, a battle between the Ottoman Empire and Greece, part of the Greco-Turkish War (1897)
Diocese of Domokos, an ancient bishopric based in Domokos
Domokos (name)
Domokos, the Hungarian name for Dămăcușeni, a village in Târgu Lăpuș town, Romania